Federal Donuts is an American fast food chain serving donuts, coffee, and fried chicken. The chain is based in Philadelphia, and is owned by Michael Solomonov.

History
The founders were inspired to open the restaurant by Philadelphia-based Cafe Soho, which serves Korean fried chicken.
A Miami branch opened in 2017 and closed in 2018.

Menu
Locations serve doughnuts, chicken, and coffee. Founder Tom Henneman has referred to these three items as "...the three comforts". The restaurant introduced a breakfast sandwich in 2019. In 2022, the restaurant switched from serving bone-in chicken to boneless chicken tenders in its fried-chicken combo.

The restaurant has collaborated on foods with other Philadelphia-based companies, including Pizza Brain and Little Baby's Ice Cream.

Media
Federal Donuts was featured on a Philadelphia episode of the Travel Channel's Man Finds Food in 2014.

Adam Sandler is depicted wearing a Federal Donuts sweatshirt in the 2022 Netflix film The Hustle.

References

2011 establishments in Pennsylvania
Doughnut shops
Fast-food poultry restaurants
Bakeries of the United States
Privately held companies based in Pennsylvania
Restaurants in Philadelphia
Restaurants established in 2011